Macrodiplosis is a genus of gall midges, insects in the family Cecidomyiidae. There are about 19 described species in Macrodiplosis.

Species
These 19 species belong to the genus Macrodiplosis:

 Macrodiplosis antennata (Felt, 1908) i c g
 Macrodiplosis castaneae (Stebbins, 1910) i b
 Macrodiplosis claytoniae (Felt, 1907) i c g
 Macrodiplosis dryobia (Low, 1877) c g
 Macrodiplosis electra (Felt, 1908) i c g
 Macrodiplosis erubescens (Osten Sacken, 1862) i c g b
 Macrodiplosis flavoscuta (Felt, 1907) i c g
 Macrodiplosis flexa Kovalev, 1972 c g
 Macrodiplosis inflexa (Bremi, 1847) g
 Macrodiplosis majalis (Osten Sacken, 1878) i c g b
 Macrodiplosis niveipila (Osten Sacken, 1862) i c g b
 Macrodiplosis pustularis (Bremi, 1847) g
 Macrodiplosis putrida (Felt, 1912) i c g
 Macrodiplosis qoruca (Felt, 1925) i b
 Macrodiplosis q-oruca (Felt, 1925) c g
 Macrodiplosis roboris Kieffer, 1895 c g
 Macrodiplosis selenis Kim & Yukawa g
 Macrodiplosis venae (Felt, 1914) c g
 Macrodiplosis visvanathi (Rao, 1952) c g

Data sources: i = ITIS, c = Catalogue of Life, g = GBIF, b = Bugguide.net

References

Further reading

External links

 

Cecidomyiinae
Cecidomyiidae genera
Taxa named by Jean-Jacques Kieffer
Articles created by Qbugbot
Gall-inducing insects

Insects described in 1895